Ågotnes Stadion is a multi-purpose stadium located at Ågotnes in Fjell, Norway, and is the home of Norwegian 1. divisjon club Øygarden and 4. divisjon (fifth tier) club Nordre Fjell. The stadium has a current capacity of 1,200 spectators.

History 
Ågotnes Stadion was opened in 1990. Former second tier club Nest-Sotra played their home games at Ågotnes until their elite licence was taken over by Øygarden FK ahead of the 2020 season.

Attendances
This shows the average attendance on Nest-Sotra's home games since their promotion to the 2014 1. divisjon.

References

External links
 Ågotnes Stadion at nestsotra.no

Football venues in Norway
Sports venues completed in 1990
1990 establishments in Norway